Andrew J. Nathan (born 3 April 1943) is a professor of political science at Columbia University.  He specializes in Chinese politics, foreign policy, human rights and political culture. Nathan attended Harvard University, where he earned a B.A. in history, an M.A. in East Asian studies, and a Ph.D. in political science.  He has taught at Columbia University since 1971, and currently serves as the chair of the steering committee for the Center for the Study of Human Rights. His previous appointments include as the chair of the Department of Political Science (2003–2006), and chair of the Weatherhead East Asian Institute (1991–1995).

Nathan also serves as an advisor or board member with Freedom House, Human Rights in China,  the National Endowment for Democracy and Human Rights Watch Asia and is a member of the editorial boards of the Journal of Democracy, China Quarterly, and the Journal of Contemporary China, among others. Nathan is perhaps best known as a co-author of the Tiananmen Papers, along with Perry Link.

He was awarded a 2013 Berlin Prize Fellowship at the American Academy in Berlin.

Books

 A History of the China International Famine Relief Commission. (Cambridge: East Asian Research Center, Harvard University; Harvard East Asian Monographs, 1965).
 Peking Politics, 1918-1923 : Factionalism and the Failure of Constitutionalism. (Berkeley: University of California Press, Michigan Studies on China,  1976). Reprinted: Ann Arbor, Mich.: Center for Chinese Studies, University of Michigan,  1998. .
  Chinese Democracy. (New York: Knopf, 1985).  .
 with David G. Johnson and Evelyn Sakakida Rawski,  ed., Popular Culture in Late Imperial China. (Berkeley: University of California Press, Studies on China,  1985). .
Human Rights in Contemporary China (1986)
China's Crisis (1990)

 with Robert Ross, The Great Wall and the Empty Fortress: China's Search for Security (1997)
China's Transition (1997)
 with Perry Link, The Tiananmen Papers (2001)
 Negotiating Culture and Human Rights: Beyond Universalism and Relativism (2001)
 with Bruce Gilley, China's New Rulers: The Secret Files (2002, second edition 2003)
Constructing Human Rights in the Age of Globalization (2003)
How East Asians View Democracy (2008)
 with Robert Ross, The Great Wall and the Empty Fortress, second edition (2009)
 with Andrew Scobell. China's Search for Security. (New York: Columbia University Press,  2012).  .

References

External links
 WorldCat Identity Page Andrew J. Nathan
 Andrew J. Nathan at the American Academy Berlin as Axel Springer Fellow

1943 births
Harvard University alumni
Columbia University faculty
American sinologists
Living people
Berlin Prize recipients